Chaturanga is an ancient Indian game.

Chaturanga may also refer to:

 Chaturanga (film), a 2008 Bengali film directed by Suman Mukherjee
 Chaturanga (Tagore novel), a 1916 novel by Rabindranath Tagore
 Chaturanga (Neelakantan novel), a 2020 historical fiction novel by Indian author Anand Neelakantan
 Chaturanga Dandasana, an asana pose in yoga practice.
 Chaturaji, a four-player version of chaturanga

See also
 Chathuranga (disambiguation)
 Chess (disambiguation)
 Turiya, caturiya